Patryk Damian Niemiec (born 18 February 1997) is a Polish volleyball player. At the professional club level, he plays for Trefl Gdańsk.

Career

National team
On 12 April 2015, the Poland national team, including Niemiec, won a title of the U19 European Champions. They beat Italy in the final (3–1). He took part in the 2015 European Youth Olympic Festival, and on 1 August 2015 achieved a gold medal after the final match with Bulgaria (3–0). On 23 August 2015, Poland achieved its first title of the U19 World Champions. In the final his team beat hosts – Argentina (3–2).

Honours

Clubs
 National championships
 2017/2018  Polish Cup, with Trefl Gdańsk

Youth national team
 2015  CEV U19 European Championship
 2015  European Youth Olympic Festival
 2015  FIVB U19 World Championship

Universiade
 2019  Summer Universiade

References

External links
 
 Player profile at PlusLiga.pl 
 Player profile at Volleybox.net

1997 births
Living people
People from Kędzierzyn-Koźle
Polish men's volleyball players
Universiade medalists in volleyball
Medalists at the 2019 Summer Universiade
Universiade silver medalists for Poland
Trefl Gdańsk players
Projekt Warsaw players
Warta Zawiercie players
Middle blockers
20th-century Polish people
21st-century Polish people